The 23rd Michigan Infantry Regiment was an infantry regiment that served in the Union Army during the American Civil War.

Service
The 23rd Michigan Infantry was mustered into Federal service at East Saginaw, Michigan, on September 13, 1862.

The regiment was mustered out of service on June 28, 1865.

Total strength and casualties
The regiment suffered 3 officers and 70 enlisted men who were killed in action or mortally wounded and 4 officers and 257 enlisted men who died of disease, for a total of 334 fatalities.

Commanders
 Colonel David Jerome, a future Governor of Michigan
 Colonel Oliver L. Spaulding

See also
List of Michigan Civil War Units
Michigan in the American Civil War

Notes

References
The Civil War Archive

Units and formations of the Union Army from Michigan
1865 disestablishments in Michigan
1862 establishments in Michigan
Military units and formations established in 1862
Military units and formations disestablished in 1865